Joseph Monaghan may refer to:

 Joseph P. Monaghan (1906–1985), U.S. Representative from Montana
 Joseph J. Monaghan, Australian physicist